Liz Hyder (born 1976 or 1977) is an English author.

Life and career

Hyder was born in London. She attended the University of Bristol where she studied drama. She has previously worked as a publicist for the BBC and was a freelance PR consultant.

Her debut novel, Bearmouth, was published by Pushkin Children’s Books in 2019 and aimed towards young adults. It is about a child called Newt who lives and works in a Victorian coalmine. It won the 2020 Branford Boase Award and the Waterstones Children's Book Prize for older readers. She published her second novel, The Gifts, in 2022 which is aimed towards adults. It is centered around four women and set in the Victorian era.

References

Year of birth missing (living people)
Living people
English children's writers
Alumni of the University of Bristol
Writers from London
21st-century English women writers